Satrapodoxa is a genus of moth in the family Gelechiidae. It contains the species Satrapodoxa regia, which is found in Guyana.

The wingspan is 9–10 mm. The forewings are black with a subdorsal streak of orange suffusion from the base to near the tornus and three pale blue-metallic streaks, the first from the base of the costa along the submedian fold to one-fourth, the second from the costa at one-fourth to just beyond the apex of the first and the third from the middle of the costa nearly to the middle of the dorsum, somewhat curved outwards. There is a postmedian transverse orange fascia, 
the lower half enclosing a somewhat oblique pale golden-metallic streak. There is also a golden-metallic spot or mark on the costa beyond this and a curved violet-metallic pre-marginal streak along the termen. The hindwings are dark fuscous.

References

Gelechiinae